Gümüşdere (literally "silver creek") is a Turkish place name that may refer to the following places in Turkey:

 Gümüşdere, Hopa, a village in the district of Hopa, Artvin Province
 Gümüşdere, Pazaryeri, a village in the district of Pazaryeri, Bilecik Province
 Gümüşdere, Tavas

See also
 Gümüş (disambiguation), "silver"